Touran may refer to:

People
 Dana Touran (born 1993), Jordanian taekwondo practitioner
 Touran Mirhadi (1927–2016), Iranian educator, researcher, and author

Other uses
 Touran Wildlife Refuge, a national park in Semnan, Iran
 Volkswagen Touran, a 2003–present German compact MPV